Phu Cat Airport  is the airport serving Qui Nhơn, Vietnam.

As well as being a commercial airport, Phu Cat is also used by the Vietnamese Air Force (Khong Quan Nhan Dan Viet Nam).

Phu Cat Airport is the hub of a new Vietnamese carrier Bamboo Airways.
Phu Cat Airport handled 1.5 million passengers in 2017.

Airlines and destinations

 History 

Phù Cát Airport was built in 1967 during the Vietnam War for the United States Air Force (USAF) by the American construction company RMK-BRJ. During the war, it was a major air base for the Republic of Vietnam Air Force and USAF. Until 1975, the airport was known as Gò Quánh Airport''. The airport was one of the major sites for Agent Orange recharge besides Bien Hoa Air Base and Da Nang Air Base. Due to heavy activities involving dioxin during the war, the ground at the airport was polluted with toxic chemicals and cleanup efforts are still ongoing. After 1975, it was used for training purpose by the Vietnamese Air Force and subsequently developed into a mixed-use airport for both regional civic air transport and military activities in 1984 following the suspension of civic service at nearby Qui Nhơn Airfield. In September 1984, the airport served its first commercial flight.

On July 10, 2003, construction on a new  passenger terminal for the airport started. The terminal was completed in June 2004. It has a capacity of 600,000 passengers per year with 2 airplane gates, 6 check-in counters and 2 conveyor belts. The airport handled 420,000 passengers in 2014 and held an average 46% annual growth in passengers. The airport served 1.5 million passengers in 2017.

On February 13, 2017, works started on the site of a new passenger terminal for Phu Cat Airport. This terminal, built on a cost of US$22 million, would have a capacity of 1.5 million passengers per year with room for expansion up to 2.4 million. The new terminal opened on May 3, 2018 and completely replaced the 2003-built terminal.

Gallery

See also

 List of airports in Vietnam

References

External links

  Official website

Airports in Vietnam
Installations of the Vietnam People's Air Force
Buildings and structures in Bình Định province